The Workers' Socialist Centre (CST) is a federation of labor unions in Venezuela that was founded in August 2008, representing 1,280,000 affiliated workers. It explicitly aims to support a transition to socialism in Venezuela.

See also

Unión Nacional de Trabajadores de Venezuela

References

Venezuela
Trade unions in Venezuela
Trade unions established in 2008
2008 establishments in Venezuela